Vice Admiral Puneet Kumar Bahl, AVSM, VSM is a serving officer in the Indian Navy. He currently serves as the Commandant of the Indian Naval Academy. He previously served as the Director General Project Seabird, Flag Officer Maharashtra Area (FOMA) in Mumbai and as the Flag Officer Commanding Goa Naval Area (FOGA) and Flag Officer Naval Aviation (FONA) in Goa.

Early life and education
Bahl graduated from the National Defence Academy, Pune. He later attended the Defence Services Staff College (DSSC), Wellington where he was awarded the Lengtaine Medal, and the Naval higher command course at the College of Naval Warfare, Mumbai.

Naval career 
Bahl was commissioned into the Indian Navy on 1 July 1984. He trained as a Naval aviator and is a maritime reconnaissance pilot, having flown six different types of aircraft. He also qualified as a ship's diver. As a pilot, he served at the naval air stations INS Garuda and INS Rajali. He also served on the Indian Air Force station AFS Yelahanka and with the CGAS 700 squadron of the Indian Coast Guard. He also participated in flying operations in Operation Tasha and Operation Vijay.

Bahl has commanded the Brahmaputra-class guided missile frigate  and the Sukanya-class patrol vessel  and served on board the aircraft carrier , the guided missile frigate  and INS Porbandar. He has served as Directing staff at DSSC Wellington and subsequently as the Joint Director Naval Air Staff (Aviation Plans) at Naval headquarters.

As a Captain, he served as the Defence Attaché (DA) in Japan and Republic of Korea at the Embassy of India at Tokyo from 2007 to 2010. As the DA, he coordinated and facilitated a Joint Declaration on Security Cooperation between India and Japan. Promoted to the rank of commodore, Bahl commanded the premier strategic airbase INS Rajali. He oversaw the induction and operationalisation of the Boeing P-8I for which the base was awarded with the unit citation by the Chief of the Naval Staff (India).

Flag rank

In January 2015, Bahl was promoted to the rank of rear admiral and appointed Assistant Chief of the Integrated Defence Staff, WSOI (ACIDS WSOI) at the Integrated Defence Staff (IDS) headquarters. After a short stint as ACIDS, in October that year, he took over as the Flag Officer Commanding Goa Naval Area (FOGA) and dual-hatted as the Flag Officer Naval Aviation (FONA).  He served as FOGA&FONA for two-and-a-half years, after which he moved to Mumbai as the Flag Officer Commanding Maharashtra Naval Area (FOMA), succeeding Rear Admiral Sanjay Mahindru in February 2018.

In 2019, he was appointed Chief Staff Officer (Training) of the Southern Naval Command in Kochi. He subsequently served as the Chief Instructor (Navy) at the Defence Services Staff College (DSSC), Wellington. On 1 January 2021, he was promoted to the rank of vice admiral and appointed Director General Project Seabird.

Personal life
Bahl is married to Anjali Bahl. The couple have two sons, Dhruv and Robin.

Awards and decorations
In 2005, he was awarded the Chief of Naval Staff commendation card. For distinguished service, he was awarded the Vishisht Seva Medal in 2015 and the Ati Vishisht Seva Medal in 2020.

See also
 Project Seabird

References 

Indian Navy admirals
Recipients of the Ati Vishisht Seva Medal
National Defence Academy (India) alumni
Living people
Year of birth missing (living people)
Indian naval aviators
Recipients of the Vishisht Seva Medal
Defence Services Staff College alumni
Academic staff of the Defence Services Staff College